The Rocky River is a  stream located in the southwest part of the U.S. state of Michigan that flows into the St. Joseph River at  in the city of Three Rivers in St. Joseph County. The Rocky River, along with the St. Joseph River and the Portage River, are the three rivers from which the city of Three Rivers takes its name.

It flows to the northeast, arcing gently to the southeast before turning sharply to the south in eastern Flowerfield Township, shortly after being joined by the Flowerfield Creek. It then flows mostly southward until joining the St. Joseph River in Three Rivers.

 In Cass County
 Marcellus Township
 Newberg Township
 Penn Township
 Volinia Township
 In Kalamazoo County
 Prairie Ronde Township (via Flowerfield Creek)
 Schoolcraft Township (via Spring Creek)
Texas Charter Township
 In St. Joseph County
 Fabius Township (via Kerr Creek)
 Flowerfield Township
 Lockport Township
 Park Township
 Three Rivers
 In Van Buren County
 Porter Township (via Sheldon Creek, Flowerfield Creek, and Four County Drain)

Tributaries 
 (left) Kerr Creek
 Little Pleasant Lake
 Pleasant Lake
 (left) Armalege Drain
 Goose Lake
 (right) Flowerfield Creek
 (right) Spring Creek
 (right) Four County Drain
 (left) Ayers Lake
 (right) Sheldon Creek
 (right) Lewis Lake
 Mud Lake
 (left) Pickerel Lake
 Skyhawk Lake
 Streaters Mill Pond
 Bogart Lake
 (right) Huyck Lake

References 

Rivers of Michigan
Rivers of Cass County, Michigan
Rivers of Kalamazoo County, Michigan
Rivers of St. Joseph County, Michigan
Rivers of Van Buren County, Michigan
Tributaries of Lake Michigan